Madha Assembly constituency (245) is one of the 288 Vidhan Sabha (legislative assembly) constituencies of Maharashtra state in western India.

Overview
Madha (constituency number 245) is one of the eleven Vidhan Sabha constituencies located in the Solapur District. It comprises parts of Madha, Pandharpur and Malshiras tehsils of this district. The number of electors in 2009 were 266,348 (Male 140,115, Female 126,233).

Madha is part of the Madha Lok Sabha constituency along with five other Vidhan Sabha segments, namely- Karmala, Sangole and  Malshiras in the Solapur district and Phaltan and Maan in the Satara District.

Members of Legislative Assembly

See also
 List of constituencies of Maharashtra Vidhan Sabha
 Madha

References

Assembly constituencies of Solapur district
Assembly constituencies of Maharashtra